The 1980–81 OHL season was the first season of the newly established Ontario Hockey League, renaming itself from the Ontario Major Junior Hockey League. The OMJHL formally severed ties with the Ontario Hockey Association over the summer, and affiliated with the Canadian Amateur Hockey Association. The OHL inaugurated the Jack Ferguson Award for the first overall draft pick in the OHL entry draft. Twelve teams each played 68 games. The Kitchener Rangers won the J. Ross Robertson Cup, defeating the Sault Ste. Marie Greyhounds.

Regular season

Final standings
Note: GP = Games played; W = Wins; L = Losses; T = Ties; GF = Goals for; GA = Goals against; PTS = Points; x = clinched playoff berth; y = clinched first round bye; z = clinched division title & first round bye

Leyden Division

Emms Division

Scoring leaders

Playoffs

Division quarter-finals

Leyden Division

(4) Oshawa Generals vs. (5) Peterborough Petes

Emms Division

(4) Niagara Falls Flyers vs. (5) Toronto Marlboros

Division semi-finals

Leyden Division

(1) Sault Ste. Marie Greyhounds vs. (4) Oshawa Generals

(2) Ottawa 67's vs. (3) Kingston Canadians

Emms Division

(1) Kitchener Rangers vs. (4) Niagara Falls Flyers

(2) Brantford Alexanders vs. (3) Windsor Spitfires

Division finals

Leyden Division

(1) Sault Ste. Marie Greyhounds vs. (3) Kingston Canadians

Emms Division

(1) Kitchener Rangers vs. (3) Windsor Spitfires

J. Ross Robertson Cup

(L1) Sault Ste. Marie Greyhounds vs. (E1) Kitchener Rangers

Awards

See also
List of OHA Junior A standings
List of OHL seasons
1981 Memorial Cup
1981 NHL Entry Draft
1980 in sports
1981 in sports

References

HockeyDB

Ontario Hockey League seasons
OHL